The 2009 San Jose State Spartans football team represented San Jose State University in the 2009 NCAA Division I FBS college football season. The Spartans, led by 5th year head coach Dick Tomey, played their home games at Spartan Stadium. The Spartans finished the season with a record of 2–10 and 1–7 in WAC play. Head coach Dick Tomey retired at the end of the season.

Personnel

Coaching Staff

Roster

Schedule

Game summaries

at No. 4 USC

No. 17 Utah

at Stanford

Cal Poly

Idaho

at Fresno State

at No. 5 Boise State

Nevada

at Utah State

Hawaii

New Mexico State

at Louisiana Tech

References

San Jose State
San Jose State Spartans football seasons
San Jose State Spartans football